Kim Mi-Jung (also Kim Mi-Jeong, ; born June 10, 1979 in Seoul) is a female South Korean race walker. She set both a national record and a personal best time of 1:29:38, by winning the women's 20 km at the 2008 National Sports Festival in Yeosu. Furthermore, Kim became the first female South Korean to cross the finish line under one hour and thirty minutes, and also, achieved a total of seven national records (2001–2008) and eight straight victories in the same event.

Kim made her official debut for the 2000 Summer Olympics in Sydney, where she placed twenty-fifth in the women's 20 km race walk, and shattered her first career national record-breaking time of 1:36.09. She also competed at the 2004 Summer Olympics in Athens, but was disqualified from the same event, for not following the proper form during the race course.

Eight years after competing in her first Olympics, Kim qualified for her third South Korean team, as a 29-year-old, at the 2008 Summer Olympics in Beijing. She successfully finished the women's 20 km race walk in twenty-eighth place by eight seconds ahead of Kazakhstan's Svetlana Tolstaya, with a time of 1:33:55.

References

External links

NBC 2008 Olympics profile

South Korean female racewalkers
Living people
Olympic athletes of South Korea
Athletes (track and field) at the 2000 Summer Olympics
Athletes (track and field) at the 2004 Summer Olympics
Athletes (track and field) at the 2008 Summer Olympics
Sportspeople from Seoul
1979 births
Athletes (track and field) at the 2002 Asian Games
Athletes (track and field) at the 2006 Asian Games
Asian Games competitors for South Korea